Noah Matteo Blasucci (born 19 June 1999) is a Swiss-Italian professional footballer from Aadorf who plays as a midfielder for Grasshopper Club Zürich in the Swiss Super League.

References

External links
 
 SFL Profile

1999 births
Living people
Swiss men's footballers
Swiss people of Italian descent
Grasshopper Club Zürich players
Swiss Super League players
Association football midfielders
Sportspeople from Thurgau